Sphenarches ontario is a moth of the family Pterophoridae that is known from Ontario, Canada.

The larvae feed on the inflorescences of certain grape species.

References

External links

Images
Other images

Platyptiliini
Moths described in 1927
Endemic fauna of Ontario
Taxa named by James Halliday McDunnough
Moths of North America